Henrietta Watson (11 March 187329 September 1964) was a Scottish actress. She was born in Dundee, Scotland, on 11 March 1873, into a theatrical family. Her maternal grandfather was actor J.B. Johnston, whom Edmund Yates considered to be “the most sterling actor on the English stage.” After the death of her father she went onto the stage, as did most of her four brothers and two sisters.

Career
She first appeared on stage was at the age of seven as the "son" of Lady Isabel Carlyle in East Lynne, a play adapted from the 1861 novel by Ellen Wood of the same name. By the time she turned 16 she was experienced enough to take "second lead" in comedies and modern dramas. As she grew older she given larger parts and was sometimes the understudy of the leading lady. 

She toured Britain for a year as the ingénue in the comedy farce Our Flat. One of her more emotionally demanding roles was playing Nellie Denver in The Silver King. She was playing the part of Stephanie in A Royal Divorce at the new Olympic Theatre, London, when she was offered a six-month engagement in Australia.

She toured Australia in 1892, with the Mrs. Bernard Beere Company, appearing in, “As in a Looking Glass.” When the company returned to Britain she was offered a three-month extension during which she appeared in The Lost Paradise. She also appeared as "Kate" in The Churchwarden, a three-act farce, at the Princess Theatre (Melbourne), in 1893. 

She visited Australia again, in 1899, when she appeared as Countess de Winter in “The King’s Musketeers.”

Selected filmography
 Driven (1916)
 The Divine Gift (1918)
 Miriam Rozella (1924)
 Reveille (1924)
 Creeping Shadows (1931)
 Jealousy (1931)
 Collision (1932)
 A Shot in the Dark (1933)
 The Pointing Finger (1933)
 Things Are Looking Up (1935)
 Barnacle Bill (1935)
 The Guv'nor (1935)
 The Cardinal (1936)
 The Brown Wallet (1936)
 The Four Just Men (1939)

References

External links

1873 births
1964 deaths
Scottish film actresses
Actresses from Dundee
20th-century Scottish actresses